Moss Tobacco Factory was a historic tobacco factory located at Clarksville, Mecklenburg County, Virginia. It was built about 1855, and was a 3 1/2-story, brick building with a gable roof erected in two sections.  The Moss Tobacco Factory operated until 1862.  It later housed an exchange or auction house for the sale of tobacco and as a tobacco warehouse.  It was demolished in February 1980.

It was listed on the National Register of Historic Places in 1979, and delisted in 2001.

References

Industrial buildings and structures on the National Register of Historic Places in Virginia
Industrial buildings completed in 1855
Tobacco buildings in the United States
Buildings and structures in Mecklenburg County, Virginia
National Register of Historic Places in Mecklenburg County, Virginia